Daporijo Airport  is located at Daporijo in the state of Arunachal Pradesh, India. Daporijo used to have scheduled services in the 1980s and early 1990s from Vayudoot.  The airport had flights to Guwahati and Dibrugarh on Dornier 228 aircraft.  Currently, there is no scheduled commercial air service to the airport, although the airport is used by the Indian Army.  The Airports Authority of India (AAI) plans to develop the airport for operation of ATR-42/ATR-72 type of aircraft.

See also 

 Arunachal Pradesh
 North-East Frontier Agency
 List of people from Arunachal Pradesh
 Religion in Arunachal Pradesh
 Cuisine of Arunachal Pradesh

 Military bases 
 List of ALGs
 List of Indian Air Force stations
 India-China military deployment on LAC
 List of disputed India-China areas
 Tianwendian
 Ukdungle

 Borders
 Line of Actual Control (LAC)
 Borders of China
 Borders of India
 
 Conflicts
 Sino-Indian conflict
 List of disputed territories of China
 List of disputed territories of India

 Other related topics
 India-China Border Roads
 List of extreme points of India
 Defence Institute of High Altitude Research
 Independent Golden Jubilee Government Higher Secondary School, Pasighat

References

External links
 Daporijo Airport at AAI
 Daporijo Airport at Great Circle Mapper

Defunct airports in India
Airports in Arunachal Pradesh
Upper Subansiri district
Airports with year of establishment missing